Miriam Mendes Belisario (30 November 1816 – 1885), also known by the pen name Little Miriam, was an English Jewish writer and educator.

Biography
Miriam Mendes Belisario was born in London in 1820, the daughter of Jamaican Jewish merchant Abraham Belisario. Her paternal grandfather was artist Isaac Mendes Belisario.

Belisario for many years ran an Orthodox girls' school in Clapton founded by her mother in 1807, in which numerous members of the Sephardic community were educated under her direction. She compiled a Hebrew and English Vocabulary for a selection of the daily prayers (1848), and wrote Sabbath Evenings at Home (1856), a collection of dialogues on the Jewish religion. Belisaro was an influence upon the Christian writer Charlotte Elizabeth Tonna.

Bibliography

References
 

1816 births
1885 deaths
19th-century English educators
19th-century women writers
English Jewish writers
Jewish educators
19th-century women educators